A Present for Dickie is a British television comedy aired from 1969 to 1970 on ITV. Cast included Dickie Henderson, Fabia Drake, Dennis Ramsden and Billy Burden. It was produced by Thames Television.

All six episodes are believed to be lost.

Premise
On his way back from a tour of the Far-East, Dickie is followed home by a baby elephant. Farcical situations ensue as Dickie tries to keep "Mini" hidden from visitors.

Partial cast
Dickie Henderson as	Dickie
Fabia Drake as	Mrs. Upshott-Mainwaring (Mother-in-law)
Dennis Ramsden as	Parker
Billy Burden as	William
Robert Raglan as	Policeman 
Jerry Ram as Abdul

References

External links

1969 British television series debuts
1970 British television series endings
Lost television shows
English-language television shows
ITV sitcoms
1960s British sitcoms
1970s British sitcoms
Television shows produced by Thames Television
Television series by Fremantle (company)